North Sumedang is a district in Sumedang Regency, West Java, Indonesia which serves as the regency seat of Sumedang Regency. It is located halfway along the provincial route connecting Bandung and Cirebon. The Cisumdawu Toll Road is planned to connect to the district in 2021, to ease travels and economic activities between Bandung, Sumedang and Kertajati International Airport.

North Sumedang is one of districts of Sumedang Regency known for its production of Tahu sumedang, a local Sundanese variant of tofu popular in West Java and other provinces of Indonesia.

Climate
North Sumedang has a tropical monsoon climate (Am) with short dry season from June to September and very significant rainfall in December, January and March.

Administrative divisions
The district comprises 13 desa and kelurahan (administrative villages) which are as follows:
Girimukti
Jatimulya
Jatihurip
Kotakaler
Kebonjati
Margamukti
Mekarjaya
Mulyasari
Padasuka
Rancamulya
Sirmanulya
Situ
Talun

References

Sumedang
Districts of West Java
Regency seats of West Java
Populated places in West Java